Gary Porter is a former American football quarterback who played one season with the Texas Terror of the Arena Football League. He first enrolled at Oklahoma State University before transferring to Northwestern Oklahoma State University. Porter attended Tomball High School  in Tomball, Texas. Porter also coached the Peoria Pirates and Mohegan Wolves.

References

External links
Just Sports Stats
College stats

Living people
Year of birth missing (living people)
American football quarterbacks
Oklahoma State Cowboys football players
Northwestern Oklahoma State Rangers football players
Texas Terror players
Peoria Pirates coaches
Manchester Wolves coaches